Pipiwai is a locality in the Te Horo valley in Northland, New Zealand. Whangārei is about 35 km to the southeast. Titoki is about 16 km to the south.

There are few jobs in the area, and most adults commute to Whangārei or Dargaville.

Demographics
The SA1 area is part of the larger Hūkerenui#Mangakahia-Hūkerenui statistical area.

The SA1 area had a population of 234 at the 2018 New Zealand census, an increase of 87 people (59.2%) since the 2013 census, and an increase of 51 people (27.9%) since the 2006 census. There were 75 households, comprising 117 males and 117 females, giving a sex ratio of 1.0 males per female. The median age was 35.2 years (compared with 37.4 years nationally), with 57 people (24.4%) aged under 15 years, 48 (20.5%) aged 15 to 29, 90 (38.5%) aged 30 to 64, and 39 (16.7%) aged 65 or older.

Ethnicities were 43.6% European/Pākehā, 75.6% Māori, 5.1% Pacific peoples, and 1.3% other ethnicities. People may identify with more than one ethnicity.

Although some people chose not to answer the census's question about religious affiliation, 35.9% had no religion, 46.2% were Christian, and 1.3% had Māori religious beliefs.

Of those at least 15 years old, 21 (11.9%) people had a bachelor's or higher degree, and 48 (27.1%) people had no formal qualifications. The median income was $20,000, compared with $31,800 nationally. 12 people (6.8%) earned over $70,000 compared to 17.2% nationally. The employment status of those at least 15 was that 66 (37.3%) people were employed full-time, 30 (16.9%) were part-time, and 12 (6.8%) were unemployed.

Marae
The local Tau Henare Marae and meeting house are a traditional meeting ground for the Ngāpuhi hapū of Te Orewai and Ngāti Hine. The Omauri marae grounds, located near Pipiwai, are a meeting place for the Ngāpuhi hapū of Ngā Uri o Puhatahi.

Education
Te Horo School is a coeducational full primary (years 1–8) school with a roll of  students as of  Te Horo Native School flourished at Pipiwai in the 1930s and 1940s.

Tau Henare Marae runs a kohanga reo.

Notable people
 Taurekareka Henare, Reform Party politician
 Lani Daniels, Boxing World title contender

Notes

Whangarei District
Populated places in the Northland Region